Jerónimo Clavijo was a Roman Catholic prelate who served as Bishop of Nisyros and Auxiliary Bishop of Cádiz.

Biography
Jerónimo Clavijo was ordained a priest in the Order of Preachers. On 28 Apr 1564, he was appointed during the papacy of Pope Pius IV as Bishop of Nisyros and Auxiliary Bishop of Cádiz. He succeeded fellow Auxiliary Bishop of Cádiz, Pedro Xague as Bishop of Nisyros.

References

External links and additional sources
 (for Chronology of Bishops) 
 (for Chronology of Bishops)  

16th-century Roman Catholic bishops in Spain
Bishops appointed by Pope Pius IV
Dominican bishops
16th-century Roman Catholic bishops in the Republic of Venice